Al-Muhtadee Billah bin Hassanal Bolkiah (born 17 February 1974) is the eldest son of Sultan Hassanal Bolkiah and his wife Queen Saleha. He is the Crown Prince of Brunei Darussalam and is first in the line of succession to the Bruneian throne.

Al-Muhtadee Billah holds the position of senior minister of the Prime Minister's Office of Brunei, General of the Royal Brunei Armed Forces and Deputy Inspector General of the Royal Brunei Police Force.

Early life
Prince Al-Muhtadee Billah was born at Istana Darul Hana, Bandar Seri Begawan on 17 February 1974. He is the first-born son and heir to the throne of Brunei. He is the son of Sultan Hassanal Bolkiah and Pengiran Anak Saleha (both first cousins). His paternal grandparents were Sultan Omar Ali Saifuddien III and Pengiran Anak Damit. His maternal grandparents were Pengiran Pemancha Pengiran Anak Haji Mohammad Alam and Pengiran Anak Hajah Besar.

Education
Al-Muhtadee Billah's education began early in life, at the Prince-Princess School at the Istana Darul Hana. He also had his primary education at St. Andrew's School in Bandar Seri Begawan. Subsequently, he progressed through the Brunei Junior Certificate of Education in 1988, and the General Certificate of Education (GCE) Ordinary Level Exam in 1991 while he was studying at the Paduka Seri Begawan Sultan Science College. He was further educated at Emanuel School in London. He passed his GCE Advanced Level exams in 1994.

Al-Muhtadee Billah attended tutorials at the University of Brunei Darussalam and began his overseas education at the Oxford Centre for Islamic Studies in October 1995. He matriculated for admission to University of Oxford's Foreign Service Programme at Magdalen College, Oxford, where he graduated in 1997. While at Oxford, he followed a program of study specially designed for him involving Islamic studies, trade, diplomacy and international relations. He received his Diploma in diplomatics Studies in a special convocation held on 3 August 1998 in Bandar Seri Begawan.

In 1988 Al-Muhtadee Billah completed the reading of the Quran and the 'ayat-ayat lazim' and also studied various aspects of Islamic teachings.

Proclamation as Crown Prince
Al-Muhtadee Billah was proclaimed Crown Prince of Brunei on 10 August 1998 at the Istana Nurul Iman. At the ceremony, his father, the Sultan of Brunei, bestowed upon him the 'Keris Si Naga'. This put him in line to become the 30th Sultan of Brunei. The ceremony was followed by the procession around the capital, Bandar Seri Begawan.

Role in government
In preparing to become the future leader and head of the country, Al-Muhtadee Billah holds several roles in government. He is the Senior Minister at the Prime Minister's Office, a general in the Royal Brunei Armed Forces, and the Deputy Inspector General of the Royal Brunei Police Force. As Senior Minister he is also Head of the National Disaster Management Committee.

As the Senior Minister in the Prime Minister's Office (and the royal court), he is being intensively groomed in all aspects of governance. When his father is abroad, he is always appointed to act as the Deputy Sultan. He also grants audience to arriving and departing foreign Ambassadors and High Commissioners. Increasingly he appears at official functions to improve his public speaking abilities in making sabda (royal speeches of a Crown Prince). He is the Deputy Chancellor of the University of Brunei Darussalam and the Chancellor of the Institute Technology Brunei; once a year he awards diplomas at the convocations of both institutions.

Marriage and family
On 9 September 2004, he married 17-year-old Pengiran Anak Sarah at Nurul Iman Palace in Bandar Seri Begawan. Guests included the Duke of Gloucester, Crown Prince Naruhito of Japan, the Yang di-Pertuan Agong of Malaysia, Princes Bandar and Saud al-Faisal of Saudi Arabia, the King of Bahrain and other Malaysian sultans. The wedding was also attended by heads of state and government from Singapore, Thailand, Malaysia, Indonesia and the Philippines. The wedding included a bersanding ceremony, and a drive around Bandar Seri Begawan in a golden-topped Rolls-Royce.

The royal couple have four children. Their first child and future heir to the Brunei throne, Pengiran Muda Abdul Muntaqim, was born on 17 March 2007 at the Raja Isteri Pengiran Anak Saleha Hospital. Their second child, a daughter, Pengiran Anak Muneerah Madhul Bolkiah, was born on 2 January 2011. Pengiran Anak Sarah gave birth to their third child and second son, Pengiran Muda Muhammad Aiman on 7 June 2015. Their fourth child and second daughter, Pengiran Anak Faathimah Az-Zahraa' Raihaanul Bolkiah, was born at 15:54, on 1 December 2017.

Issue

Personal interests
He owns sports cars from around the world, including a Lamborghini Murciélago LP640, a Mercedes-Benz SLR McLaren and a Ferrari 599 GTB Fiorano.

He is a pool and snooker enthusiast, and participated in the 2006 WPA Men's World Nine-ball Championship, and later the 2008 WPA World Eight-ball Championship. The 2007 World Pool Championship was launched on 10 October at the Sofitel Philippine Plaza Hotel in Manila; Al-Muhtadee Billah represented Brunei in the tournament at the Araneta Coliseum from 3 to 11 November.

A football club, the Brunei DPMM FC is owned by Prince Al-Muhtadee Billah, who previously played as a goalkeeper for the team.

Biography

Legacy

Titles 

 Since 10 August 1998:

Namesakes 

 Duli Pengiran Muda Al-Muhtadee Billah College, a college established in Gadong in 1974.
 Jalan Putera Al-Muhtadee Billah, a road in Bandar Seri Begawan.
 Al-Muhtadee Billah Mosque, a mosque opened in Kampong Sungai Kebun on 17 July 1987.
 Duli Pengiran Muda Mahkota Pengiran Muda Haji Al-Muhtadee Billah Mosque, a mosque opened in Kampong Tamoi on 16 January 1999.
 Pengiran Muda Mahkota Pengiran Muda Haji Al-Muhtadee Billah Hospital, a hospital opened in Tutong in 1997.

Honours

National 
  Order of the Crown of Brunei (DKMB) – (15 August 1982)
  Order of Paduka Keberanian Laila Terbilang First Class (DPKT) – Dato Paduka Seri (31 May 2004)
  Sultan Hassanal Bolkiah Medal First Class (PHBS) – (1 August 1968)
  Proclamation of Independence Medal – (1 January 1984)
  Sultan Silver Jubilee Medal – (5 October 1992)
  Sultan Golden Jubilee Medal – (5 October 2017)
  National Day Silver Jubilee Medal – (23 February 2009)
  Royal Brunei Armed Forces Golden Jubilee Medal – (31 May 2011)
  General Service Medal

Foreign 
 : 
  Grand Cordon of the Supreme Order of the Renaissance (13 May 2008)

 : 
 Lian Kiatikhounh Medal of Honour (22 March 2006)

 :
 :
  First Class of the Most Esteemed Royal Family Order of Johor (DK I) (10 September 2020)

 :
  Grand Cross of the Order of the Crown (21 January 2013) 
  Recipient of the King Willem-Alexander Inauguration Medal (30 April 2013)

 : 
  Grand Cross of the Order of Lakandula (9 November 2006)

 : 
  First Class of the Order of King Abdulaziz (3 January 1999)

 : 
  Distinguished Service Order (DUBC) (8 May 2006)

 : 
  Honorary Knight Grand Cross of the Royal Victorian Order (GCVO) (17 September 1998)

See also 
 List of current heirs apparent

References

External links
 Pictures from 2004 wedding

|-

|-

|-

1974 births
Living people
Bruneian Muslims
Bruneian royalty
Association football chairmen and investors
Alumni of Magdalen College, Oxford
People educated at Emanuel School
Members of the Legislative Council of Brunei

Grand Crosses of the Order of Lakandula
Recipients of the Darjah Utama Bakti Cemerlang
Honorary Knights Grand Cross of the Royal Victorian Order
Cue sports players at the 2010 Asian Games
Cue sports players at the 2002 Asian Games
Recipients of the Order of the Crown (Netherlands)
Grand Crosses of the Order of the Crown (Netherlands)
Heirs apparent
Bruneian footballers
Association football goalkeepers
DPMM FC players
Asian Games competitors for Brunei
Sons of monarchs